Madhavan Swaminathan is the John Pippin Chair in Electromagnetics in the School of Electrical and Computer Engineering and Director of the Center for Co-Design of Chip, Package, System, Georgia Institute of Technology.

Education 
He received his Bachelor of Engineering (B.E.) Degree in Electronics and Communication Engineering from Regional Engineering College, Tiruchirappalli (now known as National Institute of Technology, Tiruchirappalli), India in 1985 and Master of Science (M.S.) and Doctorate of Philosophy (PhD) degrees in Electrical Engineering from Syracuse University in 1989 and 1991, respectively.

Career 
He formerly held the position of Joseph M. Pettit Professor in Electronics and Deputy Director of the National Science Foundation Microsystems Packaging Research Center, Georgia Institute of Technology. Prior to joining Georgia Institute of Technology, he was with IBM working on packaging for supercomputers. He is the author of more than 450 refereed technical publications, holds 29 patents, also primary author and co-editor of three books (Power Integrity Modeling and Design for Semiconductors and Systems, Prentice Hall, 2007; Introduction to System on Package, McGraw Hill, 2008; and Design and Modeling for 3D ICs and Interposers, WSP, 2013).

Awards 
 IEEE Fellow
 Distinguished Lecturer, IEEE EMC Society
 2014 Outstanding Sustained Technical Contribution Award, IEEE Components, Packaging and Manufacturing Technology Society
 2014 Distinguished Alumnus Award from National Institute of Technology Tiruchirappalli, India

References 

Year of birth missing (living people)
Living people
National Institute of Technology, Tiruchirappalli alumni
Syracuse University alumni
Georgia Tech faculty
American people of Indian descent